A tetrasomy is a form of aneuploidy with the presence of four copies, instead of the normal two, of a particular chromosome.

Causes

Full
Full tetrasomy of an individual occurs due to non-disjunction when the cells are dividing (meiosis I or II) to form egg and sperm cells (gametogenesis).  This can result in extra chromosomes in a sperm or egg cell.  After fertilization, the resulting fetus has 48 chromosomes instead of the typical 46.

Autosomal tetrasomies

 Cat eye syndrome where partial tetrasomy of chromosome 22 is present
 Pallister-Killian syndrome (tetrasomy 12p)
 Tetrasomy 9p
 Tetrasomy 18p
 Tetrasomy 21, a rare form of Down syndrome

Sex-chromosome tetrasomies

 Tetrasomy X
 XXYY syndrome

External links 

Cytogenetics
Chromosomal abnormalities